Catopsis werckleana is a species in the genus Catopsis. This species is native to Costa Rica.

References

werckleana
Flora of Costa Rica